Ortok is a village in Kochkor District, Naryn Region of Kyrgyzstan. Its population was 1,297 in 2021.

References
 

Populated places in Naryn Region